Traitor Spy is a 1939 British thriller film directed by Walter Summers and starring Bruce Cabot, Marta Labarr, Tamara Desni and Edward Lexy. It was shot at Welwyn Studios with sets designed by Ian White. It has also been released under the title The Torso Murder Mystery. The film is adapted from the novel of the same name by Jacques Pendower.

Premise
Both Scotland Yard and the security services are on the trail of some stolen blueprints and believe there is a link with a headless body discovered in Devon.

Cast

References

External links

1939 films
British mystery thriller films
British spy thriller films
1930s English-language films
Films directed by Walter Summers
Films set in London
Films set in Devon
Films shot at Welwyn Studios
1930s spy thriller films
1930s mystery thriller films
British black-and-white films
1930s British films